The Nissan UD series of diesel engines were produced by Nissan in a range of configurations from three to twelve cylinders, all sharing the same internal dimensions. The engines were mainly used in heavy applications, such as buses and trucks produced from 1990 through 1998.

Specification

All engines retain the same bore and stroke ratio - 110 mm x 130 mm.

UD-3 - 3706 cc - straight-3 diesel engine
Applications:
 Nissan Bus U690/UG680/UR690/NUR690
 Nissan Truck U680/DUG680/TU680/U681

UD-4 - 4941 cc - straight-4 diesel engine
Applications:
 Nissan Bus R80/RX102/4R82/4RA82/4RA104
 Nissan Truck T80/T80S/T80SD/TC8
my shipping container

UD-5 - 6177 cc - straight-5 diesel engine
Applications:
 Nissan Bus 5R104/5RA104
 Nissan Truck 5TWDC10

UD-6 - 7413 cc - straight-6 diesel engine
Applications:
 Nissan Bus 6R110/6RA110
 Nissan Truck 6TW1Z/6TW1ZS/6TW12SD

UD-V8 - 9883 cc - V8 diesel engine
Applications:
 Nissan Bus U8RA110

UD-V12 - 14825 cc - V12 diesel engine
Applications:
 Nissan Dump Truck WD38

Marine applications
Nowadays, these engines find applications in boats as an alternative to Cummins diesels.

References

UD
Diesel engines by model
Straight-three engines
Straight-four engines
Straight-five engines
Straight-six engines
V8 engines
V12 engines